The Shakopee Historic District is a Registered Historic District in Shakopee, Minnesota that includes significant historical artifacts from pre-contact Native American cultures, pre- and post-contact villages of Dakotah people, and early white settlers. The earliest sign of habitation are burial mounds, while the most recent include a gristmill, inn ruins, and ferry landing.

References

Mounds in Minnesota
Native American history of Minnesota
Archaeological sites on the National Register of Historic Places in Minnesota
Buildings and structures in Scott County, Minnesota
Historic districts on the National Register of Historic Places in Minnesota
National Register of Historic Places in Scott County, Minnesota